Pa Qalatan, also rendered as Paghalatan, Pakalatun and Pa Qalatun, may refer to:
 Pa Qalatan-e Bala
 Pa Qalatan-e Pain